Myrcia neoelegans, the bashy guava, is a species of flowering plants in the family Myrtaceae. It is endemic to the Lesser Antilles.

References

External links
 Calyptranthes elegans on saintlucianplants.com

elegans
Plants described in 1895